Mrokota (died 1196) was bishop of Poznań. According to Stanisław Kozierowski, he came from the Leszczyc family.

Initially he was the chancellor of Casimir the Just (1189), but during the rebellion of the magnates against Kazimierz in 1191 he went to the side of Mieszko the Old. A bishop's nomination was probably a reward from Mieszko for this support. The date of this nomination is unknown (between 1193 and 1196). The only reliable source message about him as the Poznań bishop is the entry in the Cracow chapter of the capital, registering his death in 1196.

See also
 List of saints canonized by Pope Pius XI (Bogumił z Dobrowa)

References

1296 deaths
12th-century Roman Catholic bishops in Poland
Bishops of Poznań